Nathalie De Vos (born 9 December 1982 in Ghent) is a Belgian long-distance runner who specializes in the 5000 and 10,000 metres.

At the 2006 European Championships she finished eleventh in the 5000 m and tenth in the 10,000 m. Then, in the 10,000 metres, she finished eleventh at the 2007 World Championships and twenty-fourth at the 2008 Olympic Games.

Personal bests
5000 metres – 15:22.68 min (2006)
10,000 metres – 31:22.80 min (2007)

References

1982 births
Living people
Belgian female long-distance runners
Athletes (track and field) at the 2008 Summer Olympics
Olympic athletes of Belgium
Sportspeople from Ghent